Tuomas Vilho "Ville" Pukkila (10 May 1890 – 7 December 1968) was a Finnish wrestler. He competed in the lightweight event at the 1912 Summer Olympics.

References

External links
 

1890 births
1968 deaths
People from Vähäkyrö
People from Vaasa Province (Grand Duchy of Finland)
Olympic wrestlers of Finland
Wrestlers at the 1912 Summer Olympics
Finnish male sport wrestlers
People from Chemung County, New York
Sportspeople from Ostrobothnia (region)